Muriel Ethel Haddelsey (7 August 1894 – 1983) was an English cricketer who played as a batter. She appeared in one Test match for England in 1937, against Australia. Her sister, Joyce, also played two Tests in the series. She played domestic cricket for various composite XIs, as well as Midlands and Warwickshire.

References

External links
 
 

1894 births
1983 deaths
People from Moseley
England women Test cricketers
Warwickshire women cricketers